Didymosphaerella is a genus of fungi in the family Montagnulaceae.

References

External links
Index Fungorum

Pleosporales